Sadqay Tumhare is a Pakistani biographical drama serial based on the life of the series own writer Khalil-Ur-Rehman Qamar. It is directed by Mohammed Ehteshamuddin and co-produced by Momina Duraid, Smina Humayun Saeed and Tariq Ahmad Shah. It stars Mahira Khan, Samiya Mumtaz and Adnan Malik, who made his acting debut with this serial.

Based on writer's own real life love story, the series which is set in the 1980's, revolves around Shano and Khalil who are engaged since childhood but their family's past threatens their love.

Sadqay Tumhare was one of the most popular and acclaimed program of the year 2014–15. At annual Hum Awards, it won 10 nominations out of 15 while at Lux Style Awards it won 2 awards out of five including Best Actress for Khan and Best Writer for Qamar.

Story 
Set in the 1980s Pakistani society and based on the writer's real-life story, Sadqay Tumhare follows the story of Shano. On the very day when Shano was born, her maternal aunt, Inayat, lovingly asks Shano's mother, Rasheeda, for Shano's hand in marriage for her son, Khalil.

Cousins Shano and Khalil know about their engagement from a very young age but spent most of their childhood apart from one another as Shano is a village girl, and Khalil is from the big city. Shano is a simple small-town girl from Balgan, who takes her engagement seriously and shares her feelings often with her best friend, Humaira. At the same time, Khalil, who has been treated like the 'Prince of Punjab' his entire life and is rather arrogant, does not reciprocate the feelings that Shano feels for him. Shano is desperate to meet Khalil, as the two haven't met or seen each other for a long time. However, Khalil does not have any interest in meeting his fiancée. Shano felt this again; she would return from her grandmother's house hopeless and disappointed. But that night, Khalil has a dream in which he sees Shano, and that's when he decides to go. At the wedding, it is revealed that Rasheeda and her husband, Amin, have broken their promise and are ending the engagement. When Shano and Khalil see each other for the first time in 10 years, they immediately fall in love. They even try to meet in person, but Rasheeda prevents it. So Inayat and her husband, Abdul Rehman, tell them they will be coming the next week to their house to ask for a proper proposal for Shano.

Two days before Khalil's parents are supposed to come, Khalil comes to visit Shano. He finds out that her parents want her to marry her paternal cousin Fayaz.  Shano's parents reject Khalil's parents proposal that Khalil marries Shano. Shano then writes to Khalil, and he sets off to meet her. Dr Maqsood tries to stop him knowing that Fayaz might hurt him, but he goes anyway. When Khalil gets there, Fayaz and his friends take him to a vacant space and beat him up. Khalil gets beaten up by all of them until he picks up a log and beats Fayaz and his friends until the Maulvi saves them. Despite both of their objections, Dr Maqsood plans for Shano and Khalil to marry in court. Khalil tells Shano that they will never elope.

Later on, Khalil and Shano end up making plans to get married with the help of Dr Maqsood. On the day they are supposed to get married, a marriage proposal for Shano comes from Humera's cousin, the inspector's son. Rasheeda says yes to the proposal and arranges for their nikkah (marriage) that same day. When night falls, and it is almost time for the ceremony, Humera helps Shano run away to Khalil. Everybody finds out that Shano ran away, so they search for her. Khalil takes Shano to their maternal grandmother's place, where their maternal uncle helps them, but when they're about to get married, the police and Shano's father (Amin) stop the marriage. Khalil hides Shano safely.

Khalil takes Shano to the mosque to get married. Her mother finds out about their plan and fakes hanging herself. Shano's sister informs the couple before the marriage happens.

Rasheeda emotionally blackmails Khalil and forbids any relationship between them. Khalil agrees. Later, Humaira tells Shano that it was all planned by her mother (Shano running away etc.).
Khalil gets arrested for kidnapping Shano and forcing her to marry him. Shano says the truth in court, resulting in Khalil's case being thrown out. She goes to live with her grandmother. Shano's father promises to get Shano married to Khalil if she returns home. Shano agrees, and the date is fixed.

A day before marriage, Rasheeda tells Amin that she still loves Abdul Rehman (Khalil's father), and Amin gets paralysed. While away at the hospital, Rasheeda admits her love to Abdul Rehman and gets all clingy. Dr Maqsood witnesses this and informs Shano. Khalil and his grandmother visit Shano at her house, where they stay to take care of her. On the other hand, Humaira (Shano's best friend) falls in love with Khalil. Humaira tells Shano that according to her priest, if Shano leaves Khalil, her father will get well. Shano chooses her father. Her father gets well.

One day Khalil hugs Humaira to stop her cough because Humaira had done the same earlier. Shano is angry and tells Khalil the real reason they can never get married.

His mother's ex-husband was an immoral person and seduced young Rasheeda. Inayat divorced him. Meanwhile, she told everything to Abdul Rehman, Rasheeda's fiancé at the time. He gets heartbroken and ends up marrying Inayat instead. Inayat was pregnant with her ex-husband's child at the time, so Khalil is not Abdul Rehman's son.

Khalil and Abdul Rehman cry over the past. The same night Inayat gets sick and dies a day later.

Khalil and Shano marry different people and try to live their lives. The story leaps to the year 1994 when Khalil becomes a successful banker; one day, while working in his office, he receives the news of Shano's. Khalil goes to her funeral and meets her husband, who seeks forgiveness from Khalil; Khalil forgives Shano's husband. It is revealed that Shano died due to depression after her separation from Khalil. But Khalil is very angry with Rasheeda and pushes her away. Amin, who is still paralysed, also asks for forgiveness, and Khalil forgives. Shano's sister asks Khalil to meet Shano's son, who she had named Khurram ("Kha" from Khalil and "ru" from Rukhsana, which was Shano's real name and "m" for Mohabbat. They had planned to name their child earlier). Before leaving, he looks at the roof of the house and sees Shano's spirit/shadow looking at him.

Cast and characters 
 Samiya Mumtaz as Rasheeda - Shano's mother. She is the main person who opposes marrying Shano and Khalil, although she is the one who initially promised it. Over time, we see that Shano's mother has quite a few secrets she hides. Her character is displayed as being very quick tempered and aggressive to Shano, often hitting and yelling at her daughter. She is very abusive, and only engaged Shano and Khalil for revenge. She always lures towards Abdul Rehman
 Mahira Khan as Rukhsana Begum a.k.a. Shano - Eighteen-year-old girl from village of Balgan. Shano wishes to marry her childhood fiancé; Khalil. However, her parents insist she never see him again. Shano is at first quiet and dreamy, but becomes stronger and braver.
 Adnan Malik as Khalil-ur-Rehman Qamar - Khalil is a highly educated and outspoken young man from Lahore. He is portrayed as an angry young man having a tough and pampered personality. Although on the outside Khalil behaves in a macho manner, on the inside he is very caring and good-hearted.
 Rehan Sheikh as Mohammad Amin Janjua- Shano's father. He is seen as clueless and unintelligent, as his wife is more clever than him and controls him.
 Tahira Imam as Inaayat Bibi - Khalil's mother and Rasheeda's older sister. Inaayat is a kind and mature woman. Inaayat loves her son Khalil and is very kind to Shano, but her relationship with her sister is damaged after Rasheeda's mistreatment of Khalil. 
 Farhan Ali Agha as Abdul Rehman - Khalil's father. He is a very understanding and decent man. He wants the best for his family and always treats Shano kindly. He supports Shano and Khalil's attempt to marry. 
 Shamil Khan as Doctor Maqsood - Khalil's cousin who is six years older than him. He is a medical student living with Khalil's family. He is good friends with Khalil. Maqsood acts as Khalil's voice of reason.
 Saniya Shamshad as Humaira Batool - Shano's best friend and classmate. She is a very good friend to Shano and they discuss everything. Humaira only wants to see Shano's happiness and she tries to help Shano and Khalil. However, we later learn that everything is definitely not what it seems. This is because Humaira later creates problems between Shano and Khalil as she falls in love with Khalil and wants to marry him. Shano is shocked when she gets to know the truth.
 Mukarram Kaleem as Fayaz - Mukarram plays his role as Shano's paternal cousin. It is seen that he is interested in marrying Shano from the very beginning. After learning of Khalil he acts as a rebel in the relationship of the two, but eventually doesn't succeed and gives up on Shano.
 Imran Ashraf as Mushtaq - Humaira's cousin. He wants to marry Shano and plans against her and Khalil.
 Naghma as Bee Ji - Rasheeda and Inayat's mother. She loves Khalil and Shano very much and supports them at every turn.
 Qavi Khan as Maulvi Sanaullah
 Sara Razi as Razia - Shano's sister
  Arisha Razi as Kausar -  Shanno's younger sister
 Irfan Khoosat as Chacha Mir, Tangay wala
 Haris Waheed as Imtiaz - Fayaz's elder brother
 Saife Hassan as Mustaq's father
 Birjees Farooqui as Samina
 Anoushey Ashraf as Journalist (cameo appearance)
 Kaif Ghaznavi as Khalil's wife Ruby (cameo appearance)

Production 
Writer of the serial, Khalil-Ur-Rehman Qamar said that the serial is based on a true story, his own life, "There is no scene that has been added for the sake of the drama"

The serial was shot in many locations including rural areas of Interior Punjab. Other locations include Sialkot, Sambrial, Kotri and Karachi.

Broadcast and release 

Besides the serial's airing on TV, it was also uploaded on YouTube. All the episode were available on YouTube which were later removed in 2017. Netflix launched Pakistani dramas in 2016 and the series rights was acquired by Netflix to stream it as VOD.

The series broadcast in India on Zindagi.

Soundtrack

The official.soundtrack of the serial Haey Re Hum Sadqay Tumhare was performed by Rahat Fateh Ali Khan along with Beena Khan. The soundtrack was composed by Sahir Ali Bagga and Sohail Haider while the lyrics were written by Imran Raza.

Awards and nominations

See also
 Mera Naam Yousuf Hai starring Imran Abbas and Maya Ali
 Pyarey Afzal starring Hamza Ali Abbasi and Ayeza Khan
 Bunty I Love You starring Saba Qamar and Noman Habib
 Tum Kon Piya starring Imran Abbas and Ayeza Khan

References

External links 
 Official Website

Pakistani telenovelas
Pakistani drama television series
2014 Pakistani television series debuts
2015 Pakistani television series endings
Urdu-language television shows
Hum TV original programming
Television series set in the 1980s
Hum TV